Mocán was a medieval Irish saint.  He established Teampall Inis Adhaimh (now Barraderry Church) south-east of Carraroe, Connemara. Very little seems to be known of him, other than that he lived in the Middle Ages.

References
 A Guide to Connemara's Early Christian Sites, Anthony Previté, Oughterard, 2008.

See also
 Leo of Inis Airc
 Ríoch
 Kerrill
 Brendan

People from County Galway
Medieval Gaels from Ireland